MTS M Blaze is an EVDO (High Speed Internet) based services provided by ‘’’MTS India’’’.  MTS launched EVDO Rev A based high-speed mobile broadband service, MBlaze, in November 2009 and has seen tremendous market acceptance with over 5,00,000 (As per February 2011 Data) customers in a short span of time. In April 2010, MTS launched MTS TV for MTS MBlaze customers. MTS MBlaze have its coverage in 100+ cities as of February 2011. MTS has also announced pan-India roaming for its users in April–May 2010. MTS also provides MBrowse which is CDMA-1x technology based internet service.

About Company
MTS India (formally Sistema Shyam TeleServices Limited), referred to simply as MTS, is an Indian telecom service provider. Shyam holds the Unified Service Access License for the Rajasthan circle and operates Basic Telephony, mobile telephony (CDMA) and broadband services in the province. Shyam Telelink is the end-to-end service provider in Rajasthan with more than 269,000 subscribers as in August 2008 and a strong brand – Rainbow

National Telecom Award
MTS, the mobile telephony brand of Sistema-Shyam Teleservices (SSTL) has been conferred National Telecom Award for being the
fastest growing data operator in India. Mr. Vsevolod Rozanov, CEO, Sistema Shyam TeleServices Ltd. received the award on behalf of the company from
Mr J S Sarma, chairman, Telecom Regulatory Authority of India and Mr P J Thomas, Secretary, Department of Telecom, Government of India. The award is
recognition of MTS establishing itself as a fastest growing data operator in the market.
MTS has close to one lakh mobile broadband subscribers in less than six months, for its high speed mobile broadband service, MBlaze. Within a short span time, the
company has launched its services in 15 telecom circles(UP East and West is the latest circle) across the country and has 
already achieved an overall subscriber base of 8 million customers.

Business areas
MTS India offers tariff plans in both the Postpaid and Prepaid categories. It also offers Value Added Services (VAS) to subscribers.

Rural Telephony
SSTL also maintains a distribution network across villages, where in people are appointed and trained by SSTL – who visit villages on a bicycle or a two-wheeler at defined times on defined days of the week, selling recharge vouchers and servicing equipment; each runner covers between 200 and 300 customers.

Retail
MTS India also has its own MTS-branded store in several locations

Value added services
Short Messaging Service (SMS)
Short Code SMS Services
Callertunes
MTS Voice Portal
MTS SMS Portal
MTS Info - UTK services
My MTS (BREW)
Utility Based Services
Roaming
MTS TV

See also
 MTS India
 Mobile phone companies of India
 Nano Ganesh
 VSNL

Internet service providers of India